Mukunda Sharan Upadhyaya (Nepali: मुकुन्द शरण उपाध्याय) is a Nepali Poet and Linguist. He was born in Hemja, Near Pokhara on April 17, 1940 AD.

He is best known for his book Prakrit Pokhara (प्राकृत पोखरा) which won Madan Puraskar on 1964 AD (2021 BS). He is the author of numerous Nepali & Sanskrit books and has made important contribution to Nepali & Sanskrit language, therefore a recognized literary figure by both Nepal & India Government.

His Story 'Jhagada Ko Okhati' is famous, and a translated version of it is also taught in the school curriculum of Bangladesh.

Early life
Upadhyaya was born on 17 April 1940 in Pokhara, the son of Pandit Dasharath Upadhyaya and Keshar Kumari Upadhyaya. Upadhyaya attended Shri Nimbarka Sanskrit Mahavidyalaya Vrindavan, India. He graduated with a Masters of Arts from Tribhuvan University.

See also
Madan Puraskar
Nepali literature
Nepali Language
Sanskrit Language
List of Nepalese poets

References

Nepali-language writers
People from Pokhara
1940 births
Living people
Madan Puraskar winners
20th-century Nepalese male writers